Inge Landgut (23 November 1922 – 29 May 1986) was a German child actress. She is probably best-remembered for playing Pony Hütchen in Emil and the Detectives and as the child murder victim Elsie Beckmann in Fritz Lang's classic M, both films were released in 1931. Landgut continued her acting career into adulthood, making both film and television appearances.

During her later years, Inge Landgut also worked frequently in the German voice-dubbing business. She provided the German voice for actresses like Lois Maxwell as Miss Moneypenny in the James Bond films and Barbara Bel Geddes as Miss Ellie Ewing from Dallas. She was also the German voice of Wilma in The Flintstones and voiced figures in Disney classics like Dumbo, Lady and the Tramp and One Hundred and One Dalmatians.

Inge Landgut was married to director and actor Werner Oehlschläger (1904–1980) from 1952 until his death.

Partial filmography

 Violantha (1927) - Fini
 Angst (1928)
 Indizienbeweis (1929) - Stella
 Perjury (1929) - Elschen Sperber
 A Mother's Love (1929) - Mädi Verena, Dienstmädchen
 Women on the Edge (1929) - Inge, Kind
 The Unusual Past of Thea Carter (1929) - Inge Carter
 Phantoms of Happiness (1930) - Madeleine
 Emil and the Detectives (1931) - Auguste
 Bookkeeper Kremke (1930) - Kremke's Younger Daughter
 M (1931) - Elsie Beckmann
 Louise, Queen of Prussia (1931) - Mädchen
 Hanneles Himmelfahrt (film) (1934) - Hannele
 Das Einmaleins der Liebe (1935)
 Love Can Lie (1937)
 The Girl of Last Night (1938)
 Was tun, Sybille? (1938) - Primanerin
 Schneeweißchen und Rosenrot (1938)
 Women Are Better Diplomats (1941)
 Gaspary's Sons (1948) - Christine
 I'll Never Forget That Night (1949) - Lucie
 Our Daily Bread (1949) - Inge Webers
 Dreizehn unter einem Hut (1950) - Inge Schumann
 The Rabanser Case (1950) - Steffie
 Hilfe, ich bin unsichtbar (1951) - Ilse Sperling
 Torreani (1951) - Marianne
  (1952) - Gisella (segment "Je suis un tendre")
 Ist Mama nicht fabelhaft? (1958)
  (1962–1965, TV Series) - Frau Riedel
 Doppelgänger (1971, TV Series) - Tante Mathilde
 Tadellöser & Wolff (1975, TV Movie) - Herta de Bonsac
  (1978, TV Series) - Frau Zappow
 Iron Gustav (1979, TV Mini Series) - Mutter Quaas
  (1979–1980, TV Mini Series) - Herta de Bonsac
  (1980)
  (1981, TV Mini Series)
  (1984) - Mother

Bibliography

External links

1922 births
1986 deaths
German television actresses
German child actresses
German film actresses
German voice actresses
German silent film actresses
Actresses from Berlin
20th-century German actresses